Tommy Williams was an American jazz double bassist. He played with Art Farmer, Benny Golson, Stan Getz and others before he stopped playing in the 1960s. His last recording from that period was in 1965. He returned to playing years later, but, according to Golson, "died before he could reestablish himself." He played in the Jazztet, where, Golson reported, "I hated to follow [Williams'] bass solos [...] because he could put horn players to shame." He also played alto saxophone, piano, and vibraphone, but, according to pianist Ronnie Matthews, "Bass is what everybody wanted him for because that was the thing that would make your hair stand on end when you heard him play it." In February 1965 Williams played in the Quincy Jones orchestra for the soundtrack to the film The Pawnbroker.

Accounts of why he left music vary. Golson reported that Williams worked in a hardware store after his wife forced him to stop playing; pianist Ronnie Matthews suggested that "he was the kind of person who for whatever reason could never deal with the bullshit business part of the music business. [...] one morning when he was coming home from work with his bass, he got mugged. He just stopped playing and went to work for Sears Roebuck."

Williams latterly lived in Dean Street, Brooklyn, New York, with his wife, Audrey.

Discography

As sideman

References

External links
Steve Wallace's blog posting on Williams

American jazz double-bassists
Male double-bassists
American male jazz musicians
The Jazztet members
Year of birth missing
Year of death missing